Maruleng Local Municipality is located in the Mopani District Municipality of Limpopo province, South Africa. The seat of Maruleng Local Municipality is Hoedspruit.

Main places
The 2001 census divided the municipality into the following main places:

Politics 
The municipal council consists of twenty-seven members elected by mixed-member proportional representation. Fourteen councillors are elected by first-past-the-post voting in fourteen wards, while the remaining thirteen are chosen from party lists so that the total number of party representatives is proportional to the number of votes received. In the election of 3 August 2016 the African National Congress (ANC) won a majority of fifteen seats on the council.
The following table shows the results of the election.

References

External links 
 Official homepage

Local municipalities of the Mopani District Municipality